Boyes is an unincorporated village in southwestern Carter County, Montana, United States. It lies along U.S. Route 212 southwest of the town of Ekalaka, the county seat of Carter County.

The town was named for Harry Boyes, an early homesteader. The town was originally located at the head of Scott Creek. In 1931, it was moved to be closer to U.S. Route 212.  A post office, established in 1906, is still in operation serving ZIP code 59316.

References

Unincorporated communities in Carter County, Montana
Unincorporated communities in Montana